Chloropaschia mennusalis is a species of snout moth in the genus Chloropaschia. It is found in French Guiana.

References

Moths described in 1922
Epipaschiinae